Lagâri Hasan Çelebi was an Ottoman scientist, engineer and aviator who, according to the account written by traveller Evliya Çelebi, made a successful crewed rocket flight.

Account
Evliya Çelebi reported that in 1633, Lagari Hasan Çelebi blasted off from Sarayburnu, (the promontory below the Topkapı Palace in Istanbul) in a 7-winged rocket propelled by 50 okka (140 lbs) of gunpowder. The flight was said to have been undertaken at the time of the birth of Sultan Murad IV's daughter. As Evliya Celebi wrote, Lagari proclaimed before launching his craft "O my sultan! Be blessed, I am going to talk to Jesus!"; after ascending in the rocket, he landed in the sea, swimming ashore and joking "O my sultan! Jesus sends his regards to you!"; he was rewarded by the Sultan with silver and the rank of sipahi in the Ottoman army.

Evliya Çelebi also wrote of Lagari's brother, Hezârfen Ahmed Çelebi, making a flight by glider a year earlier.

German rocket pioneer Fritz von Opel in 1929 was the first verified human leaving Earth's surface in public by rocket power alone, piloting the Opel RAK.1 rocket plane.

Popular culture
Istanbul Beneath My Wings is a 1996 film about the lives of Lagari Hasan Çelebi, his brother and fellow aviator Hezârfen Ahmed Çelebi, and Ottoman society in the early 17th century as witnessed and narrated by Evliya Çelebi.

The legend was addressed in an experiment by the television show MythBusters, on November 11, 2009, in the episode "Crash and Burn"; however, the team noted that Evliya Çelebi had not sufficiently specified the alleged design used by Lagâri Hasan and said that it would have been "extremely difficult" for a 17th-century figure, unequipped with modern steel alloys and welding, to land safely or even achieve thrust at all. Although the re-imagined rocket rose, it exploded midflight.

See also
Hezârfen Ahmed Çelebi
Wan Hu
Fritz von Opel

References

Aviators from the Ottoman Empire
Aviation inventors
Aviation pioneers
Aircraft designers
17th-century deaths
Rocket-powered aircraft
Rocket science pioneers
17th-century people from the Ottoman Empire
Year of birth unknown
Place of birth unknown
Year of death unknown
Place of death unknown
Turkish folklore
Turkish legends
Scientists from the Ottoman Empire